Khwaja Ghulam Ahmad Ashai (Arabic: غولم أحمد أشي) was an Indian Kashmiri bureaucrat and political leader.

Life

He was the grandson of Rayees-ul-Waqt Hajji Mukhthar Shah Ashai.

In reward for his service and academic achievements, Sheikh Mohammad Abdullah appointed Ghulam Ahmad Ashai as the first Registrar of the University of Kashmir, both for academic and administrative matters, from 1948 to 1953. He led the first convocation of the University of Kashmir at Sher-e-Kashmir (Lion of Kashmir) Park and was followed by a distinguished panel including the first Prime Minister of India, Jawaharlal Nehru and the Pro-Indian Sheikh Abdullah. Ashai's involvement with Kashmir University started when he was appointed as the Special Officer assigned with the responsibility of starting Kashmir's first university. Ashai spent the next two years touring universities across India building up strategic ties and relations with renowned and established universities.

In the 1980 Sheikh Abdullah's National Conference government, in recognition of Ashai's contributions as founding registrar designated the main road leading to the present university campus in Hazratbal as Ghulam Ahmad Ashai Road.

References

External links
   Memorial trust formed in memory of Ghulam Ahmad Ashai, Pakistan Tribune, 26 August 2005
 History - Kashmir Media; Wordpress, Wordpress
 Vitasta - A Kashmir Sabha, Kolkata Publication
 University of Kashmir - About Us page

20th-century Indian Muslims
Kashmiri Muslims
People from Srinagar
University of Calcutta alumni
Year of birth missing
Year of death missing